York Unitarian Chapel is a building on St. Saviourgate, York, England. It is a member of the General Assembly of Unitarian and Free Christian Churches, the umbrella organisation for British Unitarians.

It is in the form of a Greek cross and was built in 1692 or earlier. It is a Grade II* listed building. It is thought to be the first brick building of any size in York with load-bearing brick walls.

A major benefactor was Lady Sarah Hewley, a Protestant dissenter and widow of Sir John Hewley, MP. Lady Hewley also founded almshouses in Tanner Row in York, which were moved by the railway in 1839 to be the present Lady Hewley's Almshouses in St Saviourgate. There are also twelve almshouses known as Colton's Hospital in Shipton Street.

The most famous minister of the Chapel was Charles Wellbeloved, who was at first assistant to the Rev. Newcome Cappe and then minister until his death in 1858. He was involved in saving the York city walls from being used to provide building materials, ended malpractices at York County Lunatic Asylum, founded the York Mechanics' Institute, wrote a guide to York Minster and initiated an appeal after a fire destroyed a Minster screen. He was Principal of Manchester College, one of the dissenting academies for training ministers and the higher education of lay students.

References

External links

 York Unitarians website

Unitarian Chapel, York
Unitarian
Unitarian chapels in England
Religious buildings and structures completed in 1692
17th-century Protestant churches
1692 establishments in England
St Saviourgate